The R175 road is a regional road in Ireland, running its full length on the Cooley Peninsula in County Louth. It runs northeast from its junction with the R173 at The Bush to its terminal point at Greenore Port via Rogan's Cross, Saint James' Well; and the Shore Road at Greenore all in the County Louth. Two kilometres (1.2 mi) south of Greenore it is joined by the R176 from nearby Carlingford.

See also
Roads in Ireland
National primary road
National secondary road

References
Roads Act 1993 (Classification of Regional Roads) Order 2006 – Department of Transport

Regional roads in the Republic of Ireland
Roads in County Louth